Pony Girl is a Canadian indie art rock band from Ottawa, Ontario, formed in 2012. Their records have appeared on Canadian campus radio charts and in rotation on CBC Radio 2 as well as Radio-Canada.

History
Pascal Huot is the principal songwriter, as well as vocalist and guitarist. The other songwriters and members are guitarist Julien Dussault, bassist Greggory Clark, percussionist Jeff Kingsbury and multi-instrumentalist Yolande Laroche. Kingsbury joined the band in 2013.

Huot is also a filmmaker whose Pony Girl music videos have been selected by juried film festivals in Canada and the United States.

Pony Girl has toured extensively across Canada. In 2022 they signed to Paper Bag Records following earlier releases to So Sorry Records, an independent Canadian music label.

Discography
2013: Show Me Your Fears
2015: Foreign Life
2022: Enny One Wil Love You

Awards and nominations

See also

Canadian rock
List of bands from Canada

References

External links
 
 Pony Girl on CBC Music

2012 establishments in Ontario
Canadian indie rock groups
Canadian indie pop groups
Musical groups established in 2012
Musical groups from Ottawa